Dmitry Valerievich Utkin (born 11 June 1970) is a Russian army officer. He served as a special forces officer in the GRU, where he held a rank of lieutenant colonel. He is alleged to have founded the Wagner Group, with his own call-sign reportedly being Wagner. Utkin has received four Orders of Courage of Russia.

Early life 
Utkin was born on 11 June 1970, in the village of Smolino, Kirovograd, of the Ukrainian Soviet Socialist Republic.
He was married to Elena Shcherbinina, but the couple divorced in the early 2000s.

Political views 
Members of Wagner Group reported that Utkin is a Rodnover, a believer of Slavic native faith. Utkin has been alleged by the Latvia-based Meduza to have sympathies with Nazi Germany, and believed by the British NationalWorld to be a neo-Nazi because of the images that surfaced in 2021, purportedly showing Utkin with a Waffen-SS collar tab and Reichsadler tattoos on his neck and chest.

Utkin hasn't made any public appearances since 2016.

Military career

Russia and Slavonic Corps 

Utkin served as the commander of the 700th Separate Special Detachment of the 2nd Separate Special Brigade of the Main Directorate of the General Staff of the Armed Forces of the Russian Federation (GRU), stationed in Pechory, Pskov Oblast, until 2013. After retiring, he joined the Slavonic Corps, fighting on the side of Syrian President Bashar al-Assad during the civil war in 2013, but returned to Moscow in October.

Wagner Group 

Almost immediately after returning to Russia, Utkin reportedly created his own mercenary group. Utkin, who reportedly has a passion for the history of the Third Reich, had the call-sign Wagner, allegedly in honour of Richard Wagner. Utkin and his "Wagner Group", as well as several veterans of the Slavonic Corps were seen both in Crimea in February 2014 and then in Donbas, where they fought for the pro-Russian separatists during the Russo-Ukrainian War. Gazeta.ru reports that Utkin and his men could have been involved in the killing of several field commanders of the self-proclaimed Luhansk People's Republic. Turkish newspaper Yeni Şafak reported that Utkin was possibly a figurehead for the company, while the real head of Wagner was someone else.

Utkin was seen in the Kremlin during the celebration of Fatherland's Heroes Day on 9 December 2016. He attended the celebration as a laureate of four Orders of Courage, and was photographed with the President of Russia, Vladimir Putin. Dmitry Peskov, the Press Secretary for the Russian President, admitted that Utkin was indeed among the invitees, but did not comment on his connection with the mercenaries.

RBK reported that after completing a training in Krasnodar Krai, Utkin and his men returned to Syria in 2015. Soon after the start of the Russian aerial strikes, reports emerged on the deaths of Russian mercenaries fighting on the ground. Several images spread in the social media apparently depicting armed Russian men killed during the Battle of Palmyra in March 2016. Sky News reported that approximately 500 to 600 people, mostly Wagner mercenaries, were killed in Syria in 2016.

Sanctions 

In June 2017, the United States imposed sanctions against Utkin as the head of Wagner Group. In November 2017, RBK reported the appointment of Utkin as CEO of Concord Management and Consulting, the managing company of the restaurant holding owned by Yevgeny Prigozhin, who is believed to be the financier of Wagner Group. Bellingcat contends that this was a different Dmitry Utkin, however.

On 13 December 2021, the Council of the European Union imposed restrictive measures against Utkin and other individuals associated with the Wagner Group. In relation to Utkin, he was accused of being "responsible for serious human rights abuses committed by the group, which include torture and extrajudicial, summary or arbitrary executions and killings."

Sanctioned by New Zealand in relation to the 2022 Russian invasion of Ukraine.

References 

1970 births
21st-century Russian military personnel
GRU officers
Living people
People from Kirovohrad Oblast
People of the Wagner Group
Pro-Russian people of the war in Donbas
Recipients of the Order of Courage
Russian individuals subject to European Union sanctions
Russian individuals subject to the U.S. Department of the Treasury sanctions
Russian military personnel of the Syrian civil war